Saint-Louis is a commune in the overseas department of Guadeloupe. Saint-Louis lies on the north of the island of Marie-Galante, and is the island's largest commune. Many beaches lie on the west coast of the commune.

Population

Education
Public preschools and primary schools include:
 Ecole primaire Léopold Lubino
 Ecole maternelle Guy Dramort

Public junior high schools include:
 Collège Albert Baclet

See also

 Communes of the Guadeloupe department
 List of lighthouses in Guadeloupe

Gallery

References

External links
 Site of the Tourist Office 
 Tourist guide 

Marie-Galante
Communes of Marie-Galante
Communes of Guadeloupe